Möseke (also: Mösecke, in its upper course Haferriede) is a river of Lower Saxony, Germany. It flows into the Südaue north of Barsinghausen.

See also
List of rivers of Lower Saxony

References

Rivers of Lower Saxony
Rivers of Germany